McKinney Stables of Empire City Farms is a historic stable building located at Cuba in Allegany County, New York. It is a massive concrete block and terra cotta horse barn built in 1907–1909, and located on a  property in a semi-rural section of the town of Cuba. It was built by William Simpson to house his prize trotter McKinney and McKinney's offspring. Linear in plan, the 3-story center section is flanked by two, 2-story  wings, that end in -story cross-gable story pavilions. The stable property lies adjacent to the South Street Historic District.

It was listed on the National Register of Historic Places in 1999.

References

External links
CUBA NEW YORK GARLIC FESTIVAL - Empire City Farms

Agricultural buildings and structures on the National Register of Historic Places in New York (state)
Buildings and structures completed in 1907
Buildings and structures in Allegany County, New York
National Register of Historic Places in Allegany County, New York
Stables in the United States